Bitti may refer to the following people:

 Bernardo Bitti (1548–1610), Italian Jesuit priest and painter
 Davide Ricci Bitti (born 1984), Italian cyclist
 Francesco Ricci Bitti (born 1942), Italian former tennis player and President of the International Tennis Federation from 1999 to 2015
 Satwinder Bitti (born 1975), Punjabi singer
 Bitti Deva, birth name of Vishnuvardhana (reigned 1108–1152), a king of the Hoysala Empire
 Bitti Mohanty, Indian convicted rapist and fugitive

See also
 Tendai Biti (born 1966), Zimbabwean politician, Minister of Finance from 2009 to 2013
 Bitty